HLP may refer to:
 Halim Perdanakusuma Airport, in East Jakarta, Indonesia, IATA code
 Haryana Lokhit Party, a political party; see Haryana Legislative Assembly
 Hepatocyte growth factor-like protein
 Houston Lighting & Power, HL&P, former Texas, US utility 
 Huntington Library Press, an American publisher
 .hlp, a file extension for several help file types, including WinHelp